Scottish Liberals for Independence (SLFI; Scots: Scots Leeberals for Unthirldom, Scottish Gaelic: Libearalaich na h-Alba airson Neo-eisimeileach) is a progressive, liberal organisation which campaigns for Scottish independence. The organisation was originally set up to represent pro-independence members within the Liberal Democrats, but later the group decided to drop attempts to affiliate with the party and instead opened membership to anyone that agreed with their policies.

History 
SLFI was founded on 29 August 2022 by Cameron Greer and Jake Stevenson who were Liberal Democrat members that originally backed Scotland remaining as part of the United Kingdom. After appealing to set up a pro-independence group within the Liberal Democrats, Greer and Stevenson decided to form the group independently of the party and become a campaign group for support Scottish independence.

Policies and views 
SLFI supports Scotland becoming an independent republic in the European Union and that it should adopt its own currency straight after independence and that a Universal Basic Income should also be introduced afterwards. Alongside, their policies surrounding independence, SLFI also advocate the safeguarding of transgender rights.

References 

2022 in British politics
Political organisations based in Scotland
Political campaigns in the United Kingdom
Scottish independence
Scottish republicanism
Liberalism in the United Kingdom